Baps or BAPS may refer to:

 Bochasanwasi Akshar Purushottam Swaminarayan Sanstha (BAPS), a denomination within the Swaminarayan Sampradaya
 B.A.P.S, a 1997 comedy feature film
 Plural of bap, a type of bread roll
 BAPS (song), a 2019 song by Trina and Nicki Minaj
 Broken Arrow Public Schools

See also
 BAP (disambiguation)